Gian Carlo is an Italian masculine blended given name that is a combination of Gianni and Carlo. Notable people known by this name include the following:

Gian Carlo Aliberti, also Giovanni Carlo Aliberti, (1670 - 1727), Italian painter
Gian Carlo Abelli (1941 – 2016), Italian politician
Gian Carlo Capicchioni (born 1956), Sammarinese politician
Gian Carlo di Martino (born 1964), Venezuelan politician
Gian Carlo Fusco (1915 – 1984), Italian writer, journalist, screenwriter and occasional actor
Gian Carlo Menotti (1911 – 2007), Italian composer and librettist
Gian Carlo Michelini (born 1935), Italian Roman Catholic priest
Gian Carlo Muzzarelli (born 1955), Italian politician
Gian Carlo Oli (1934 - 1996), Italian lexicographer
Gian Carlo Passeroni (1713 – 1803), Italian poet
Gian Carlo Gamboa Sotto, known as Gian Sotto, (born 1978), Filipino politician & actor
Gian Carlo Tramontano, nickname of Giovanni Carlo Tramontano, Count of Matera, (1451 – 1514), Italian nobleman 
Gian Carlo Vacchelli (1981 – 2020), Peruvian sports commentator and politician
Gian Carlo Wick (1909 – 1992), Italian theoretical physicist
Gian Carlo Flain (1986-1992) american murder victim

See also

Giancarlo
Gian-Carlo

Notes

Italian masculine given names